Annet Malherbe (born 23 November 1957) is a Dutch actress. She is known for her roles in films directed by her husband Alex van Warmerdam, such as Voyeur, The Northerners, The Dress, Little Tony and Grimm. Malherbe was nominated for European Film Award for Best Actress for Little Tony.

In January 2012, it was confirmed Malherbe, Kasper van Kooten, Marcel Musters and Jelka van Houten would be the stars of a new RTL4 sketch show, What If?.

Personal life 
Malherbe has been married to actor, filmmaker and musician Alex van Warmerdam, and appeared in five out of six films he directed — Voyeur (1986), The Northerners (1992), The Dress (1996), Little Tony (1998), Grimm (2003) and The Last Days of Emma Blank (2009). They have two children — Mees and Houk, who are also actors.

In 2010, Malherbe confessed she had had problems with depression in the past.

Filmography

Awards and nominations

References

External links 
 

1957 births
Dutch film actresses
Dutch stage actresses
Dutch television actresses
Living people
Actors from Rotterdam